The Sinaia lead plates are a set of lead plates written in an unknown language or constructed language. They are alleged to be a chronicle of the Dacians, but are considered by most scholars to be modern forgeries. The plates were written in the Greek alphabet with a few other character additions.

History

The origin of the Sinaia lead plates is obscure. The first known mention of them was when the 200 lead plates were discovered in the warehouse of the Bucharest Museum of Antiquities, Romania, in the 19th century. Of the 200 pieces originally in the collection of plates, only 35 are known to remain today, but there are some photos of some of the rest.

When discovered they were ignored and considered to be forgeries because they appeared new, with no traces of corrosion. They were not considered valuable enough to be evacuated with the rest of the Romanian Treasure to Russia in 1916, during World War I. However, some renewed interest in the plates among non-scholars has been shown more than a century later, following the publication of a report about them by engineer Dan Romalo in 2003. 

According to "an oral tradition", the lead plates are in fact copies made at the Nail Factory of Sinaia in 1875 from the originals, which were allegedly made of gold, and they were kept for a while at the Sinaia Monastery. Allegedly, the gold was used either in the building of Peleș Castle, or the plates were part of the Romanian Treasure which was never returned by Russia after World War I.

Description

Most of the plates are roughly rectangular, with the exception of one round plate. They have dimensions between 93mm x 98mm and 354mm x 255mm. Most are written using scriptio continua in the Greek alphabet, with a few additional signs; the text includes "V" from the Latin alphabet and signs for palatal "c" and "g" resembling those of the Cyrillic script.

They also include text written in some unknown scripts that do not resemble any known written alphabet. In addition to the text, the plates also contain many complex illustrations, including those of armies, kings, cities, temples and buildings.

Language

The language appears to have some Indo-European traits, but it has nothing in common with what linguists expect to be Dacian language, as no correlation with the Romanian language substrate can be found. 

Also, unlike any known Indo-European language, it appears to have almost no inflections, nor declensions. In addition, almost all nouns end in "-o", including names which had other endings in Latin and Greek, e.g.

Debate and author

The scholarly consensus is that they are modern forgeries. According to the director of the Institute of Archaeology, Alexandru Vulpe, it is obvious they were made in 19th century and this was the opinion of both Vasile Pârvan and the archaeologists who studied them after him, some believing they were created by Bogdan Petriceicu Hasdeu, who is known to have made other forgeries as well.

According to Vulpe, the tablets include only what was known before 1900, for example, it uses the spelling "Comidava" for a Dacian town, although now it is known that the correct spelling is "Cumidava", as found in 1942 in an honorific inscription dedicated to Julia Mamaea.

See also 
Tărtăria tablets
Gradeshnitsa tablets
Lead Books of Sacromonte, forged inscriptions on lead plates

References

Bibliography 
Dumitru Manolache, Tezaurul dacic de la Sinaia – legendă sau adevăr ocultat?, Editura Dacica, 2006
 Bucurescu, Adrian, Tainele tăblițelor de la Sinaia, Editura Arhetip, 2005
 Romalo, Dan, Cronica apocrifă pe plăci de plumb?, Arvin Press, București, 2003
 Romalo, Dan, Cronica getă apocrifă pe plăci de plumb, Editura Alcor, București, 2005
 Velcescu, Cornelia, Inscripții rupestre din Munții Carpați, Editura MIRACOL, Burești, 2002 
 Horia Turcanu (Formula AS): "Misterul tăblițelor de plumb"
 Academia Republicii Popular Romîne, Documente privind istoria Romîniei: Introducere, 1956
 Emil Vîrtosu, Paleografia româno-chirilică, Ed. Științifică, 1968
 Horace Gray Lunt, Old Church Slavonic Grammar, Walter de Gruyter, 2001
 Isaac Taylor, History of the Alphabet: Aryan Alphabets, Kessinger Publishing, 2003 (1899) 
 Isaac Taylor, Greeks and Goths a Study on the Runes, Kessinger Publishing, 2004 (1879) 
 Winfred Philipp Lehmann, Historical Linguistics: An Introduction, Routledge, 1992 (1962)

External links 
 Photo Gallery at Bibliotheca Dacica [broken link]
 A possible Dacian royal archive on lead plates
 Dacian Lead Tablets and Codex Rochonczi, Fake or Real? 
 Din tainele istoriei: misterul plăcuţelor de la Sinaia (in Romanian, with photos of the plates)
 100 de placi din aur inscriptionate intr-o limba necunoscuta descoperite la Sinaia (in Romanian, with pictures of more than 20 of the plates)
 Placute plumb (in Romanian, with photos)

19th-century archaeological discoveries
19th-century inscriptions
Archaeological forgeries
Constructed languages introduced in the 19th century
Inscriptions of disputed origin
Lead objects
Sinaia